Ruco Chan Chin-pang (born 14 January 1977) is a Hong Kong actor and singer.

Chan is the first TVB actor to win My Favourite TVB Actor at the StarHub TVB Awards for three consecutive years (2014, 2015, 2016), and is also the first actor to make two consecutive wins for Favourite TVB Actor at the TVB Star Awards Malaysia (2015, 2016). In 2016, Chan won the TVB Anniversary Award for Best Actor with his performance in the action drama A Fist Within Four Walls.

Early life
Chan was born in Hong Kong with ancestral roots from Xiamen, Fujian. His father was a firefighter and his mother was a tailor. Influenced by his father at a young age, Chan developed a love for table tennis and joined the Hong Kong Table Tennis team after receiving rigorous training at the Jubilee Sports Academy when he was thirteen. He was the youngest player to represent Hong Kong in overseas competitions at the time. After five years of committing to the sport, Chan left the team upon finishing his high school education exams. After graduation, Chan was accepted into a technical institution and, attracted by the 3,000 HKD monthly income, also joined TVB's Artiste Training Class. Being only seventeen at the time, Chan was required to have his parents' signed approval before signing a management contract with TVB. His father initially refused, but later gave in when TVB offered an automatic contract cancellation if Chan didn't do well in his classes. Chan graduated from TVB's Seventh Artiste Training Class of 1994.

Career
Chan's television debut was in the serial drama Instinct in 1994, where he briefly appeared as the young friend of Ekin Cheng's character Pao Man-lung. Weeks later, he made a brief appearance in the sitcom A Kindred Spirit as the friend of Andy, portrayed by Hawick Lau, who was Chan's training class classmate. For the next three years, Chan performed in minor roles in over eighteen TVB television dramas. Chan left TVB in 1998 after signing a record deal with PolyGram. Prior to the release of his debut EP, Universal acquired PolyGram and Chan's contract with PolyGram became defunct. For the next few years, Chan won several small supporting roles in various Hong Kong films. When he had no filming jobs, he would work as a renovation worker, earning only 300 HKD per day.

In 2001, Chan signed with ATV to start working on television acting again. According to Chan, his first two years at ATV were "rough, uncomfortable, and filled with regret." Despite his past acting experiences in both television and film, ATV only gave him minor roles and spots in music videos. Chan's first major role was in the 2004 period drama Love in a Miracle, playing the main antagonist. He was then given a major supporting role in My Date with a Vampire III (2004). Besides performing in television dramas, Chan also made appearances in many variety shows, and hosted many gala ceremonies for ATV.

Unsatisfied with his career at ATV, Chan returned to TVB in 2008 and signed an eight-year management contract with the company. He was cast into supporting roles in several successful television dramas, such as The Threshold of a Persona (2009), Burning Flame III (2009), The Mysteries of Love (2010), Ghost Writer (2010), When Lanes Merge (2010), and Every Move You Make (2010), most of them being villainous roles. In 2011, Chan garnered media attention and critical acclaim for his portrayal of barrister Keith Lau in the television legal drama The Other Truth. He earned his first nominations for Best Actor and My Favourite Male Character at the 2011 TVB Anniversary Awards.

Chan's subsequent performances won him critical acclaim, most notably in Brother's Keeper (2013), Ruse of Engagement (2014), and Captain of Destiny (2015), the latter winning him the TVB Anniversary Award for Most Popular Male Character. He is the first actor to win My Favourite TVB Actor at the StarHub TVB Awards for three consecutive years (2014, 2015, 2016), and is also the first actor to make two consecutive wins for My Favourite TVB Actor at the TVB Star Awards Malaysia (2015, 2016). In 2016, Chan won the TVB Anniversary Award for Best Actor for A Fist Within Four Walls.

Personal life
Chan began a romantic relationship with Miss Asia winner Eunis Yiu in 2008. They broke up in 2010.

In the next few years, there were rumours of Chan dating actresses, but none have resulted in quite as much media attention as his Brother's Keeper and All That is Bitter is Sweet partner Linda Chung and later, A Fist Within Four Walls and The Unholy Alliance partner Nancy Wu.

In 2016, while a guest judge for Miss Hong Kong, he met contestant Phoebe Sin and subsequently in March 2017, was photographed in a car with her on The Peak. The media highlighted this relationship, with the vast majority of public response taking negative views of Phoebe and also Chan's handling of the matter. On 10 September 2018, Chan announced his engagement to Phoebe. They were married on 13 October the same year. On 10 November 2018, the couple announced that they were expecting their first child via Instagram. Their daughter Quinta Chan was born on 14 April 2019.

Filmography

Television dramas

Film

Discography
1998: Blue 
1998: Chui Ho Kwan Hai
CD1, Track 9: "Wan Ha La"

Soundtrack appearances

Other appearances

Awards and nominations

TVB Anniversary Awards

|-
| rowspan="2" style="text-align:center;"| 2011
| rowspan="2"| The Other Truth
| Best Actor
| 
|-
| My Favourite Male Character
| style="background-color:#ffcc66; text-align:center;"| Top 5
|-
| rowspan="2" style="text-align:center;"| 2013
| rowspan="2"| Brother's Keeper
| Best Actor
| style="background-color:#ffcc66; text-align:center;"| Top 5
|-
| My Favourite Male Character
| 
|-
| rowspan="4" style="text-align:center;"| 2014
| Ruse of Engagement
| Best Actor
| style="background-color:#ffcc66; text-align:center;"| Top 5
|-
| Outbound Love
| My Favourite Male Character
| 
|-
| "So Close" (Outbound Love OST)
| Most Popular Drama Theme Song
| 
|-
| "Nick of Time" (Ruse of Engagement OST)
| Most Popular Drama Theme Song (with Ron Ng)
| 
|-
| rowspan="3" style="text-align:center;"| 2015
| rowspan="2"| Captain of Destiny
| Best Actor
| style="background-color:#ffcc66; text-align:center;"| Top 5
|-
| Most Popular Male Character
| 
|-
| "Next Century" (Captain of Destiny OST)
| Most Popular Drama Theme Song
| 
|-
| rowspan="6" style="text-align:center;"| 2016
| rowspan="3"| A Fist Within Four Walls
| Best Actor
| 
|-
| Most Popular Male Character
| style="background-color:#ffcc66; text-align:center;"| Top 5
|-
| Most Popular On-Screen Partnership (with Benjamin Yuen)
| 
|-
| "Siege" (A Fist Within Four Walls OST)
| Most Popular Drama Theme Song
| 
|-
| "Never Know You Are the Best" (A Fist Within Four Walls OST)
| Most Popular Drama Theme Song (with Nancy Wu)
| 
|-
| "No One Can Change" (Brother's Keeper II OST)
| Most Popular Drama Theme Song
| 
|-
| rowspan="3" style="text-align:center;"| 2017
| rowspan="3"| The Unholy Alliance
| Best Actor
| style="background-color:#ffcc66; text-align:center;"| Top 5
|-
| Most Popular Male Character
| 
|-
| "Trigger On" (The Unholy Alliance OST)
| 
|-
| rowspan="5" style="text-align:center;"| 2018
| rowspan="5"| Succession War
| Favourite Actor in Malaysia
| style="background-color:#ffcc66; text-align:center;"| Top 3
|-
| Favourite Actor in Singapore
| style="background-color:#ffcc66; text-align:center;"| Top 3
|-
| Best Actor
| 
|-
| Most Popular Male Character
| 
|-
| "Remorse" (Succession War OST)
| 
|-
| rowspan="4" style="text-align:center;"| 2021
| rowspan="4"| Sinister Beings
| Best Actor
| style="background-color:#ffcc66; text-align:center;"| Top 5
|-
| Most Popular Male Character
| 
|-
| Favourite Actor in Malaysia
| style="background-color:#ffcc66; text-align:center;"| Top 5
|-
|-
| Most Popular Onscreen Partnership (with Rosina Lam)
| style="background-color:#ff8072; text-align:center;"| Top 10
|-
| rowspan="14" style="text-align:center;"| 2022
| The Righteous Fists
| rowspan="4"|Best Actor
| 
|-
| My Mom, My Ping Pong
| 
|-
| Against Darkness
| 
|-
| I’ve Got The Power
| style="background-color:#ffcc66; text-align:center;"| Top 5
|-
| The Righteous Fists
| rowspan="4"|Most Popular Male Character
| 
|-
| My Mom, My Ping Pong
| 
|-
| Against Darkness
| 
|-
| I’ve Got The Power
| style="background-color:#ff8072; text-align:center;"| Top 10
|-
| The Righteous Fists
| rowspan="4"|Favourite TVB Actor in Malaysia
| style="background-color:#ff8072; text-align:center;"| Top 10
|-
| My Mom, My Ping Pong
| 
|-
| Against Darkness
| 
|-
| rowspan="2"|I’ve Got The Power
| 
|-
| Most Popular Onscreen Partnership (with Natalie Tong, Joel Chan, Tiffany Lau, Jazz Lam)
| style="background-color:#ff8072; text-align:center;"| Top 10
|-
| "Same Way" (The Righteous Fists OST)
| Most Popular Drama Theme Song
| 
|}

My AOD Favourites Awards

|-
| rowspan="2" style="text-align:center;"| 2011
| rowspan="2"| The Other Truth
| My Favourite Actor
| style="background-color:#ffcc66; text-align:center;"| Top 5
|-
|  My Top 15 Favourite Drama Characters 
| 
|-
| rowspan="3" style="text-align:center;"| 2012
| rowspan="3"| No Good Either Way
| My Favourite Actor
| 
|-
|  My Top 15 Favourite Drama Characters 
| 
|-
| My Favourite Onscreen Couple (with Kristal Tin)
| 
|}

TVB Star Awards Malaysia

|-
| rowspan="3" style="text-align:center;"| 2013
| rowspan="3"| Brother's Keeper
| Favourite TVB Actor
| style="background-color:#ffcc66; text-align:center;"| Top 5
|-
|  Top 15 Favourite TVB Characters 
| 
|-
| Favourite TVB Onscreen Couple (with Linda Chung)
| style="background-color:#ffcc66; text-align:center;"| Top 5
|-
| rowspan="3" style="text-align:center;"| 2014
| rowspan="3"| Outbound Love
| Favourite TVB Actor
| style="background-color:#ffcc66; text-align:center;"| Top 3
|-
|  Top 15 Favourite TVB Characters 
| 
|-
|  Favourite TVB Onscreen Couple (with Aimee Chan) 
| 
|-
| rowspan="3" style="text-align:center;"| 2015
| rowspan="3"| Captain of Destiny
| Favourite TVB Actor
| 
|-
|  Top 16 Favourite TVB Characters 
| 
|-
| Favourite TVB Onscreen Couple (with Grace Chan)
| style="background-color:#ffcc66; text-align:center;"| Top 3
|-
| rowspan="4" style="text-align:center;"| 2016
| rowspan="3"| A Fist Within Four Walls
| Favourite TVB Actor
| 
|-
|  Top 15 Favourite TVB Characters 
| 
|-
|  Favourite TVB Onscreen Couple (with Nancy Wu) 
| 
|-
|  "Never Know You Are the Best" (A Fist Within Four Walls OST) 
|  Favourite TVB Drama Theme Song (with Nancy Wu) 
| 
|-
| rowspan="3" style="text-align:center;"| 2017
| rowspan="3"| The Unholy Alliance
| Favourite TVB Actor
| style="background-color:#ffcc66; text-align:center;"| Top 3
|-
|  Top 17 Favourite TVB Characters 
| 
|-
|  Favourite TVB Onscreen Couple (with Nancy Wu)  
| 
|}

StarHub TVB Awards

|-
| rowspan="3" style="text-align:center;"| 2012
| rowspan="3"| The Other Truth
| My Favourite TVB Actor
| 
|-
| My Favourite TVB Male TV Characters
| 
|-
|  My Favourite TVB New Male Artiste 
| 
|-
| rowspan="3" style="text-align:center;"| 2013
| rowspan="2"| Slow Boat Home
| My Favourite TVB Actor
| 
|-
|  My Favourite TVB Male TV Characters 
| 
|-
| "Little Grass" (Reality Check OST)
| My Favourite Drama Theme Song
| 
|-
| rowspan="3" style="text-align:center;"| 2014
| Ruse of Engagement
|  My Favourite TVB Actor 
| 
|-
| Brother's Keeper
|  My Favourite TVB Male TV Characters 
| 
|-
| "Wheel of Time" (Brother's Keeper OST)
| My Favourite TVB Theme Song (with Edwin Siu)
| 
|-
| rowspan="2" style="text-align:center;"| 2015
| rowspan="2"| Captain of Destiny
|  My Favourite TVB Actor 
| 
|-
| My Favourite TVB Male TV Characters
| 
|-
| rowspan="6" style="text-align:center;" | 2016
| rowspan="3"| A Fist Within Four Walls 
|  My Favourite TVB Actor 
| 
|-
| My Favourite TVB Male TV Characters
| 
|-
|  My Favourite TVB Onscreen Couple (with Nancy Wu) 
| 
|-
| "Siege" (A Fist Within Four Walls OST)
| My Favourite TVB Theme Song
| 
|-
| "Never Know You Are the Best" (A Fist Within Four Walls OST) 
|  Favourite TVB Theme Song (with Nancy Wu) 
| 
|-
| "No One Can Change" (Brother's Keeper II OST)
| My Favourite TVB Theme Song 
| 
|-
| rowspan="3" style="text-align:center;" | 2017
| rowspan="3" | The Unholy Alliance
| My Favourite TVB Actor
| 
|-
|  My Favourite TVB Male TV Characters 
| 
|-
| My Favourite TVB Onscreen Couple (with Nancy Wu)
| 
|}

Weibo Stars Awards

|-
| rowspan="2" style="text-align:center;"| 2014
| rowspan="2"| Brother's Keeper
| Weibo's Most Brilliant Male TV Character
| 
|-
| Weibo's Most Brilliant TV Drama
| 
|-
| rowspan="4" style="text-align:center;"| 2015
| rowspan="3"| Ruse of Engagement
|  Weibo's Most Brilliant Male TV Character 
| 
|-
| Weibo's Most Brilliant TV Drama
| 
|-
| Weibo's Most Brilliant On-Screen Couple (with Aimee Chan)
| 
|-
| All That is Bitter is Sweet
| Weibo's Most Brilliant On-Screen Couple (with Linda Chung)
| 
|-
| rowspan="4" style="text-align:center;"| 2016
| rowspan=3"| Captain of Destiny
|  Weibo's Most Brilliant Male TV Character 
| 
|-
| Weibo's Most Brilliant TV Drama
| 
|-
| Weibo's Most Brilliant CP (with Grace Chan)
| 
|-
| Eye in the Sky
|  Weibo's Most Brilliant TV Drama 
| 
|}

Jade Solid Gold Music Awards

|-
| rowspan="3" style="text-align:center;"| 2016
| "No One Can Change" (Brother's Keeper II OST)
| rowspan="2" | Gold Song Award
| 
|-
| rowspan="2" | "Never Know You Are the Best" (A Fist Within Four Walls OST)
| 
|-
| Best Duet (Gold) (with Nancy Wu)
| 
|}

Others
2012 Singapore Entertainment Awards—Most Popular Hong Kong TV Actor
2013 Singapore Entertainment Awards—Most Popular Hong Kong TV Actor
2014 Singapore Entertainment Awards—Most Popular Hong Kong TV Actor
2015 Yahoo! Asia Buzz Awards—Most Searched Male TV Artiste
2016 McMillan Woods Global Awards—Asia Pacific Best Male Actor
2016 Yahoo! Asia Buzz Awards—Most Popular Male TV Artiste
2016 Yahoo! Asia Buzz Awards—Most Popular TV Drama Duet (with Nancy Wu)

References

External links
Ruco Chan at Sina Weibo
Ruco Chan at TVB.com

1977 births
Living people
20th-century Hong Kong male actors
20th-century Hong Kong male singers
21st-century Hong Kong male actors
21st-century Hong Kong male singers
Hong Kong male television actors
Hong Kong male film actors
TVB veteran actors
Cantopop singers